is a football (soccer) club based in Kakogawa, which is located in Hyōgo Prefecture in Japan. They play in the Kansai Soccer League, which is part of Japanese Regional Leagues.

History 
Founded as Hyogo Teacher Kicking Group in 1976, it became a club in 1987 renamed Central Kobe. In 2005, the club had a new rebranding, being named Banditonce Kakogawa, from the mix of Spanish words Banditos (Spanish for "bandits") and Once (Spanish for "eleven"). In 2008 the club moved from Kobe to the actual venue, Kakogawa. Konigs-Krone had been a sponsor for the team, but in the end they withdrew from financial support.

They played from a long time in first division of Kansai Soccer League, which they won five times; in 2007 they actually won Regional Leagues, but they didn't have the license to get promoted to Japan Football League. They also featured eight times in Emperor's Cup, reaching the 4th round in 2006.

League record 

Key

Honours 
 Kansai Soccer League 
Champions (5): 1982, 2005, 2006, 2007, 2008

Current squad

References

External links
Official Site 

Football clubs in Japan
Sports teams in Hyōgo Prefecture
Association football clubs established in 1976
1976 establishments in Japan